Ryszard Kulesza (28 September 1931 – 19 May 2008) was a Polish footballer, coach and official, one of managers of the Poland national football team. His father was killed during the Warsaw Uprising, and Kulesza himself, who was 13, was lucky to survive, as a German soldier threw him under a passing tank. After the uprising, he was forcibly taken to Germany as Ost-Arbeiter, but escaped and returned to Poland on foot.

After the war, Kulesza played in such teams, as Okęcie Warszawa, Polonia Warsaw, and Polonia Bydgoszcz. He ended his career as a player in 1961, and began working as a coach. In 1972–1974, Kulesza coached Lechia Gdańsk, and since 1974, he worked with several national teams of Poland, such as U-21 (1974–1975), and U-23 (1975–1978). In 1976, Kulesza co-worked with Kazimierz Górski, and later with Jacek Gmoch (1976–1977 and 1978). In October 1978, after Gmoch's resignation, he took the post of general manager of Polish national team, but left this post in December 1980, as a result of the Okęcie Airport incident. He was replaced with Antoni Piechniczek.

In the 1980s, Kulesza worked in Tunisia and Morocco, returning to Poland in late 1980s. He became an activist of the Polish Football Federation (PZPN), founding the school of football coaches, which was popularly called kuleszówka. He actively fought corruption, and in 1993, he supported stripping Legia Warsaw of its championship title, after Warsaw's team routed Wisła Kraków 6–0 in Kraków. Kulesza died in a hospital, suffering from Alzheimer disease. He was buried on 29 May 2008 at Warsaw's Czerniaków Cemetery.

References

1931 births
2008 deaths
Footballers from Warsaw
People from Warsaw Voivodeship (1919–1939)
Polish footballers
Polonia Warsaw players
Polish football managers
Polish expatriate football managers
Lechia Gdańsk managers
Poland national football team managers
Club Athlétique Bizertin managers
Tunisia national football team managers
CS Sfaxien managers
1982 African Cup of Nations managers
Association football forwards
Polish World War II forced labourers